The 2023 Gold Coast Titans season is the 17th in the club's history. They will compete in the National Rugby League's 2023 Telstra Premiership. The Captain Tino Fa'asuamaleaui and Head Coach Justin Holbrook maintain their respective club roles for the 2023 NRL Season.

Player Movement
These movements happened across the previous season, off-season and pre-season.

Gains

Losses

Pre-Season Challenge

Regular Season

2023 Squad

References

 Gold Coast Titans seasons
Gold Coast Titans season
2023 NRL Women's season